Enlightenment is the official soundtrack album of the 2012 Summer Paralympics opening ceremony. It was released as digital download on 30 August 2012. It features dialog from Stephen Hawking.

Track listing

References 

2012 soundtrack albums
2012 Summer Paralympics
Decca Records soundtracks
Pop compilation albums